(), is an Armenian actress. She is known for her roles as Mane on Full House and Arpi on Slave of Love. Sara in Elen’s Diary 1,2. Nenet in Alien.

Filmography

References

External links 
 
 "Wedding Day" at the YouTube
 Page on ArmFilm
 Article about Marinka Khachatryan
 Article about Marinka Khachatryan
 Photos of Marinka Khachatryan

Living people
Actresses from Yerevan
Armenian film actresses
21st-century Armenian actresses
Year of birth missing (living people)